Tikdar or Tik Dar may refer to:
 Tikdar, Kerman
 Tik Dar, Ravar, Kerman Province
 Tikdar-e Pay Sang, Kerman Province